Lindsay Bartholomew (born 1944) is a British artist who is notable for her watercolour paintings of the British landscape.

Bartholomew was born on the Wirral in Cheshire and between 1961 and 1964 studied at the Ruskin School of Drawing in Oxford. In her final year at the Ruskin she won the Ruskin Prize for Portraiture. After graduating, Bartholomew taught in London for twelve years and in 1977 had her first solo exhibition at the MacRobert Gallery at the University of Stirling. In 1985 Bartholomew moved to Somerset and continued to paint the rural countryside. Bartholomew has participated in a large number of group shows at commercial galleries, including the Grafton Gallery, the Maas Gallery and Roland, Browse & Delbanco, and also exhibited with the Royal West of England Academy.

References

1944 births
Living people
20th-century British painters
20th-century English women artists
21st-century British painters
21st-century English women artists
Alumni of the Ruskin School of Art
English contemporary artists
English watercolourists
People from the Metropolitan Borough of Wirral
Women watercolorists